The , formerly the , is a public school for the deaf in , Suginami, Tokyo, managed by the Tokyo Metropolitan Board of Education. It was the first Deaf educational program to be established in the eastern capital during the Meiji period.

History
The Tokyo School for the Deaf was established in 1880.  Initially, the school adopted a manual teaching method, despite international trends towards oralism. In 1897, the director was Shinpachi Konishi.

In 1915, alumni of the Tokyo School for the Deaf founded the Japanese Association of the Deaf.  This organization was the precursor of the Japanese Federation of the Deaf.

By the 1930s, the institution had grown to include an elementary school, a middle school, and a training department.  The training department was intended for the training of those who planned to be teaching the Deaf.

Program
Currently, the Central School for the Deaf serves students in two Tokyo venues: Shakuji Campus (石神井校舎) in Nerima and Otsuka Campus (大塚校舎) in Toshima. Otsuka is now .

In September 2010, some of the Tokyo faculty and students begin participating in an exchange program with their counterparts at Rochester School for the Deaf in Rochester, New York.

Notes

References
 Erting, Carol. J. (1994). The Deaf Way: Perspectives from the International Conference on Deaf Culture (1989). Washington, DC: Gallaudet University Press. ;  OCLC 260213909

External links
 Tokyo Central School for the Deaf 

Education in Tokyo
Educational institutions established in 1880
Schools for the deaf in Japan
1880 establishments in Japan